Edward Legge (1767 – 27 January 1827) was an English churchman and academic. He was the Bishop of Oxford from 1816 and Warden of All Souls College, Oxford, from 1817.

Life 
He was the seventh son of William Legge, 2nd Earl of Dartmouth and Frances Catherine Nicoll. Educated at Rugby School, he became a Fellow of All Souls, Student of Christ Church, Oxford in 1785, and vicar of Lewisham.

He was a canon of Stall XI at Canterbury Cathedral from 1797 to 1802 following which he served as a Canon of the Twelfth Stall in St George's Chapel, Windsor from 1802 to 1805. He was a royal chaplain from 1797 and Deputy Clerk of the Closet from 1803, resigning the position when made Dean of Windsor in 1805.

He was Dean of Windsor until 1816, when he was raised to the episcopacy as Bishop of Oxford, a position he held until his death in 1827 .

References 

1767 births
1827 deaths
People educated at Rugby School
Alumni of Christ Church, Oxford
Fellows of Christ Church, Oxford
Fellows of All Souls College, Oxford
Wardens of All Souls College, Oxford
Canons of Windsor
Deans of Windsor
Bishops of Oxford
Younger sons of earls
Edward
Deputy Clerks of the Closet